Christina Smith (born 25 December 1968) is a Canadian bobsledder. She competed in the two woman event at the 2002 Winter Olympics.

References

External links
 

1968 births
Living people
Canadian female bobsledders
Olympic bobsledders of Canada
Bobsledders at the 2002 Winter Olympics
Sportspeople from Montreal